To the Shores of Iwo Jima is a 1945 Kodachrome color short war film produced by the United States Navy and United States Marine Corps. It documents the Battle of Iwo Jima, and was the first time that American audiences saw in color the footage of the famous flag raising on Iwo Jima.

Overview
The film follows the servicemen through the battle in rough chronological order, from the bombardment of the island by warships and carrier-based airplanes to the final breakdown of resistance. Although it shows the taking of Mount Suribachi, it then switches to the footage of the second flag raising.

The film ends by acknowledging the 4,000 who had died in the month-long battle, and tells the audience that their deaths were not in vain, showing a bomber aircraft taking off from the island for a mission over Japan.

Production notes
Four cameramen, including USMC Sgt. Bill Genaust (who shot the flag raising sequence), were killed in action. Ten other camera operators were wounded.

It was partially filmed in Wildwood Regional Park in Thousand Oaks, California.

Award nominations
The film was nominated for an Academy Award for Best Documentary Short.

Film

See also

 List of Allied Propaganda Films of World War 2
 List of films in the public domain in the United States

References

External links

  — digitally scanned by the National Archives and Records Administration
 Watch To the Shores of Iwo Jima at the National Archives and Records Administration
 
 

1945 films
American short documentary films
Battle of Iwo Jima films
American World War II propaganda shorts
Films about the United States Marine Corps
Articles containing video clips
American black-and-white films
Warner Bros. short films
1940s short documentary films
Japan in non-Japanese culture
Pacific War films
1940s English-language films
1940s American films